Future Sex may refer to:
Future Sex (magazine), an erotic magazine published from 1992 to 1993
Future Sex, a 2016 book by Emily Witt

See also
FutureSex/LoveSounds, a 2006 album by Justin Timberlake
"FutureSex/LoveSound", a 2006 song by Justin Timberlake
FutureSex/LoveShow, a 2007 concert tour by Justin Timberlake
Future Sex Drama, a 2012 album by Lunic